European Right may refer to:

 European Right (1984–1989), European political group
 European Right (1989–1994), European political group